Llanigon is a village and community in Powys, Wales on the edge of the Brecon Beacons National Park, north of the Black Mountains, Wales. The community population was  478. The nearest town is Hay-on-Wye, some 1.5 miles (2 km) to the east. It is in the historic county of Brecknockshire.

History
The parish church is dedicated to the mysterious Saint Eigon, who may have been a daughter of Caratacus or (more probably) a brother of Saint Cynidr of nearby Glasbury.  The former interpretation has inspired Barbara Erskine's novel The Warrior's Princess, partly set in Llanigon. The church predates the Norman Conquest, though the current building (parts of which are Norman) is somewhat later.

The manor was formerly known as Llanthomas (or Thomas Church) and was part of the lordship of Hay. Remains of a motte, believed to be 11th or 12th century, survive near the old manor house, which was demolished in the 20th century. In 1522, the manor belonged to Walter Devereux, 1st Viscount Hereford. It was said to be the birthplace of William Thomas, who died in 1554. He was a scholar of Italian and Italian history, politician and a clerk of the Privy Council under Edward VI; he was executed for treason after the collapse of Wyatt's Rebellion.

Llwynllwyd barn, to the west of the village, was a dissenting academy in the eighteenth century. The pioneer Welsh Methodist Howell Harris and the hymn writer William Williams Pantycelyn were both educated there.

In the 1870s the diarist Francis Kilvert, curate of Clyro, was a regular visitor to the then vicar of Llanigon, the Rev. William Thomas, and fell in love with his daughter, Daisy. Her father asked Kilvert not to pursue the matter, probably because as a mere curate he was not sufficiently well-placed. Kilvert noted "On this day when I proposed for the girl who will I trust one day be my wife I had only one sovereign in the world, and I owed that." Daisy never married and is buried in Llanigon churchyard.

Notes

External links
 www.geograph.co.uk : photos of Llanigon and surrounding area

Villages in Powys
Black Mountains, Wales